Arnold of Egmond (14 July 1410 – 23 February 1473) was Duke of Guelders, Count of Zutphen.

Life
Arnold was born in Egmond-Binnen, North Holland, the son of John II of Egmond and Maria van Arkel.

On 11 July 1423, Arnold, still a boy, succeeded Duke Reinald IV. Arnold was the grandson of Reinald's sister, Johanna. Although the Emperor Sigismund had invested the Duke of Berg with the duchy of Gelders, Arnold retained the confidence of the Estates by enlarging their privileges, and enjoyed the support of Duke Philip of Burgundy. Arnold was betrothed, and afterwards united in marriage to Catherine of Cleves, a niece of Philip of Burgundy. Subsequently, however, Duke Arnold fell out with his ally as to the succession to the see of Utrecht, whereupon Philip joined with the four chief towns of Guelders in the successful attempt of Arnold's son Adolf to substitute his own for his father's authority. Arnold gave up his claim on Jülich only after his defeat in 1444 by Gerhard VII, Duke of Jülich-Berg.

When Charles the Bold became Duke of Burgundy in 1467, after rejecting a compromise, Adolph was thrown into prison. Arnold, against the will of the towns and the law of the land, pledged his duchy to Charles for 300,000 Rhenish florins (1471). Upon Arnold's death two years later at Grave, Charles took possession of the duchy, starting a series of wars that would last more than 70 years.

Family and children

Arnold was married in Cleves on 26 January 1430 to Catherine of Cleves (1417–1479), daughter of Adolph IV, Duke of Cleves and Marie of Burgundy. Their children were:
 Mary (c. 1431–1463), married 3 July 1449 to James II, King of Scots
 William (born c. 1434), died young
 Margaret (c. 1436–1486, Simmern), married on 16 August 1454 to Frederick I, Count of Palatine-Simmern.
 Adolf (1438–1477)
 Catherine (1439–1496), Regent of Geldern in 1477–1481. She was married possibly secretly in 1464 to Louis de Bourbon, Bishop of Liège.

Ancestors

References

Sources

1410 births
1473 deaths
House of Egmond
Dukes of Guelders
People from Egmond
15th-century people of the Holy Roman Empire